Nabih Salim Chartouni Kuri (born 20 December 1973) is a Mexican former professional footballer who played as a midfielder. He played for Liga MX club Puebla from 1997 to 1999, and is currently a sports commentator for Fox Sports.

References

External links

1973 births
Living people
Footballers from Mexico City
Mexican people of Lebanese descent
Club Puebla players
Sports commentators
Association football midfielders
Sportspeople of Lebanese descent
Mexican footballers